Walk the Prank is an American comedy television series created by Adam Small and Trevor Moore that premiered on Disney XD on April 1, 2016. The series stars Cody Veith, Bryce Gheisar, Brandon Severs, Jillian Shea Spaeder, and Tobie Windham.

Premise 
The series is about practical jokers Herman, Chance, Bailey, and Dusty, who set up elaborate pranks and find real people to perform the pranks on. Their pranks usually involve supernatural, scary, funny or gross elements. For example, a typical prank may involve a scary story coming to life or children with supernatural powers using their powers to harm people, scare or threaten the target, etc. The pranks are mastered by special effects teams, and many of the ‘other targets‘ (the fictional characters used in the prank to create a story) are stuntmen/actors. Some pranks involve psychic powers to foretell the future, and in that case the target’s friend knows that they are being pranked and helps set the target up for it. For example, a prank was once used where Bailey was a robot who could read people’s minds, all the information about the person was given by their friend who set them up.

Episodes

Cast 
 Cody Veith as Chance
 Brandon Severs as Dusty
 Bryce Gheisar as Herman
 Jillian Shea Spaeder as Bailey
 Tobie Windham as Will
 Chloe Guidry as J.D.

Production 
The series was created by Adam Small and Trevor Moore in 2015. Disney XD aired a sneak peek of the series on April 1, 2016 On July 28, 2016, Disney XD renewed the series for a second season. The second season premiered on April 1, 2017. On August 31, 2017, Disney renewed the series for a third season, which premiered on April 21, 2018.

Ratings 
 

| link2             = List of Walk the Prank episodes#Season 2 (2017–18)
| episodes2         = 20
| start2            = 
| end2              = 
| startrating2      = 0.27
| endrating2        = 0.22
| viewers2          = |2}} 

| link3             = List of Walk the Prank episodes#Season 3 (2018)
| episodes3         = 11
| start3            = 
| end3              = 
| startrating3      = 0.13
| endrating3        = 
| viewers3          = |2}} 
}}

References

External links 
 

2010s American children's comedy television series
2010s American reality television series
2016 American television series debuts
2018 American television series endings
American children's reality television series
Disney XD original programming
English-language television shows
Single-camera television sitcoms
Television series about children